Stjørdalselva is a  long river that reaches from near the Norwegian–Swedish border down the Stjørdalen valley through the municipalities of Meråker and Stjørdal before entering the Trondheimsfjord.  The mouth is located between the villages of Stjørdalshalsen and Hell just south of Trondheim Airport, Værnes. The mouth of the river was moved to allow the runway to expand into the delta.

The European route E14 highway and the Meråker Line railway follow the river from its source the entire length of the river.

References

Rivers of Trøndelag
Stjørdal
Meråker
Rivers of Norway